China Bowl may refer to:

 China Bowl (NFL), a proposed football game by the National Football League
 China Bowl (CAFL), the championship football game for the China Arena Football League
 China Bowl (1945), a game between US Army and Navy players held in Shanghai